The Adamastor skink (Trachylepis adamastor) is a species of skink in the family Scincidae. The species is endemic to the islet Tinhosa Grande southwest of Príncipe in São Tomé and Príncipe. It was first described in 2015.

References

External links

adamastor
Endemic vertebrates of São Tomé and Príncipe
Reptiles described in 2015
Taxa named by Luis M. P. Ceríaco